Dave Currey may refer to:

 Dave Currey (American football) (born 1943), college athletics administrator and former American football player and coach
 Dave Currey (environmentalist) (born 1953), environmentalist, writer and photographer

See also 
 David Currie (disambiguation)